This is the discography for rapper Hitmaka.

Albums

Studio albums

EP

Mixtapes

Singles

As lead artist

As featured artist

Guest appearances
2006: "Hit The Black/Slide In" – Shawnna (featuring Yung Berg)
2007: "Bitch Please" – Lil Wayne (featuring Yung Berg)
2007: "Lonely" – Collie Buddz (featuring Yung Berg)
2008: "Sexy Can I" – Ray J (featuring Yung Berg)
2008: "Karma" – Nipsey Hussle (featuring Yung Berg, Cap-1 & Question)
2008: "Feelin' On You" – K. Smith (featuring Yung Berg)
2008: "My Shawty" – Ca$ha (featuring Yung Berg)
2008: "Cold (Remix)" – Alex Young (featuring Yung Berg)
2008: "Heels On" – Slim of 112 (featuring Yung Berg & D aka Deezo)
2009: "Un Poquito" – Pitbull (featuring Yung Berg)
2009: "Like Mine" – Kidd Domination (featuring Harlem's Cash)
2009: "I Do It Better" – Collie Buddz (featuring Yung Berg)
2009: "Go Stupid" – K-Young (featuring Yung Berg & Andre Lightskin)
2009: "285 (Drankin' N' Drivin) Remix" – Ludacris (featuring Yung Berg & Young Jeezy)
2009: "All Night Long" – Hot Dollar (featuring Pitbull, Yung Berg & K-Young)
2010: "Like Me" – Kay L (featuring DJ Quik & Yung Berg)
2010: "Out Of My Life" – Brooke Hogan (featuring Yung Berg)
2010: "What U Want" – Lil Scrappy (featuring Yung Berg & Stuey Rock)
2013: "Could It Be U" – Don Trip (featuring Yung Berg and Mia Rey) 
2013: "Can We Kick It" – Jimi Productionz (featuring Yung Berg, Alli Davis & Dei Hamo)
2014: "Double Up" – DJ Infamous (featuring Yung Berg, Jeezy, Ludacris, Juicy J & The Game)

Music videos

As lead artist
2007: "Sexy Lady" (featuring Junior)
2007: "Sexy Lady (Remix)" (featuring Jim Jones & Rich Boy)
2008: "Sexy Can I"  (Ray J featuring Yung Berg)
2008: "Sexy Can I (2nd Version)" (Ray J featuring Yung Berg)
2008: "Do That There" (featuring Dude N Nem)
2008: "What It Do" (featuring J.F.K.)
2008: "The Business" (featuring Casha)
2008: "Get Money" 
2008: "Outerspace" 
2008: "Put It on Me" 
2009: "Festyville" 
2009: "6 In Tha Mornin" 
2009: "Favorite Song" 
2010: "Sex In The City"
2011: "Loving You Like Me"
2011: "The Cypher" (featuring Brisco, Young Chris, Ransom, Freddy P, Guyana, Ball Greezy, Ice Berg, Chad, Jordan Hollywood and Diego Cash) 
2011: "So Amazing"
2011: "Derrick Rose" (featuring Marvo) 
2011: "Burning Bridges" (featuring Sammie)
2012: "WPPD" 
2012: "Redempition/Wait For You" (featuring  Mia Rey and YD The Best) 
2012: "Shawty U Can Get It" (featuring Mia Rey and Dricky Graham)  
2014: "She's The One"
2015: "Masika's Interlude" (featuring Goldie)
2019: "Thot Box" (Dance Video) (featuring Meek Mill, 2 Chainz, A Boogie wit da Hoodie, Tyga and YBN Nahmir) 
2019: "Thot Box" (Memoji Video) (featuring Meek Mill, 2 Chainz, A Boogie wit da Hoodie, Tyga and YBN Nahmir) 
2019: "Thot Box" (Remix) (featuring Young MA, Dreezy, DreamDoll, Mulatto and Chinese Kitty)
2021: "Only You" (with Eric Bellinger)
2021: "Hit Eazy" (with Eric Bellinger)
2021: "Hype Beast" (with Eric Bellinger) 
2021: "SERIOUS" (with Eric Bellinger) 
2021: "Star Projectors" (with Eric Bellinger)
2021: "TRUTH HURTS" (with Eric Bellinger)
2021: "Quickie" (with Queen Naija and Ty Dolla $ign) 
2022: "Down Bad" (with Fabolous and Jeremih featuring Ivory Scott)

Production credits

List of Songs Co Produced by Yung Berg

2010: Lil Wayne – "John" (Polow da Don alongside Natown, Rob Holladay & Yung Berg as The Dream Team)
2012: Driicky Graham – "Snap Backs & Tattoos"
2013: Don Trip "She Want" (featuring Jae Fitz & Juicy J)
2013: Tamar Braxton – "The One" (K.E. on the Track alongside Yung Berg)
2013: Alley Boy – "Stack It Up" (Young Chop alongside Yung Berg)
2013: DJ Infamous – "Double Cup"
2014: Teairra Marí – "Deserve"
2014: Nicki Minaj – "Want Some More", "Favorite" (featuring Jeremih), "Shanghai"
2015: Yo Gotti – "Rihanna"
2015: Jeremih – "Giv No Fuks" (featuring Migos), "Worthy" (featuring Jhené Aiko)
2016: K. Michelle – "Ain't You"
2016: Kid Ink – "Nasty" (featuring Jeremih & Spice) (Smash David alongside Yung Berg)
2016: 4EY The Future – "No Time To Waste" (featuring Wale) 
2016: Big Sean – "Bounce Back" (Smash David, Amarie Johnson, and Metro Boomin alongside Yung Berg) 
2017: Jeremih – "I Think of You" (featuring Chris Brown and Big Sean)
2017: Kid Ink – "F with U" (featuring Ty Dolla $ign) (DJ Mustard and J Holt alongside Yung Berg)
2017: Gucci Mane – "Tone It Down" (featuring Chris Brown)
2017: Pia Mia – "I'm A Fan" (featuring Jeremih) 
2017: Sevyn Streeter – "Anything You Want" (featuring Ty Dolla $ign, Jeremih and Wiz Khalifa) (RetroFuture alongside Yung Berg)
2017: Sevyn Streeter - "Soon as I Get Home" (RetroFuture alongside Yung Berg) 
2017: Justine Skye – "Back For More" (featuring Jeremih) (AyoNKeys alongside Yung Berg)
2017: K. Michelle – "Birthday"
2017: Wiz Khalifa – "Something New" (featuring Ty Dolla $ign) 
2017: Chris Brown – "Confidence" (Soundz, Cardiak and A1 alongside Yung Berg)
2017: Ty Dolla $ign – "Ex" (featuring YG) (Bongo ByTheWay and Ty Dolla $ign alongside Yung Berg) 
2017: Ty Dolla $ign – "Droptop in The Rain" (featuring Tory Lanez) (Lee on the Beats alongside Yung Berg) 
2017: Ty Dolla $ign – "Lil Favorite" (featuring MadeinTYO) (Prince Chrishan and A1 alongside Yung Berg) 
2017: Ty Dolla $ign – "All The Time" (Johnny Stokes, A1Jovan, Prince Christian and A1 alongside Yung Berg)
2017: Kid Ink – "Swish" (featuring 2 Chainz) (Dre Moon and A1 alongside Yung Berg)
2017: Yo Gotti – "Oh Yeah" (featuring French Montana) (Ayo and Keys alongside Yung Berg)
2018: Wiz Khalifa – "LetterMan" (808 Mafia alongside Yung Berg)
2018: Tinashe – "Me So Bad" (featuring French Montana and Ty Dolla $ign)
2018: Bri Steves – "Jealousy"
2018: Meek Mill – "Dangerous" (featuring Jeremih and PnB Rock)
2018: Ty Dolla $ign – "Pineapple" (featuring Gucci Mane and Quavo) (Cashmoney AP alongside Yung Berg)
2018: Tinashe – "Like I Used To" 
2018: Tinashe – "Throw A Fit"
2018: The Bonfyre - "Ready To Love"
2018: Ty Dolla $ign – "Number" 
2018: Ty Dolla Sign – "Simple" (featuring Yo Gotti) 
2018: Ty Dolla $ign – "Drugs" (featuring Wiz Khalifa) 
2018: MihTy — "The Light", "Goin Thru Some Thangz", "FYT" (featuring French Montana), "Perfect Timing", "New Level", "Take Your Time", "These Days", "Surrounded" (featuring Chris Brown and Wiz Khalifa), "Lie 2 Me" and "Ride It". 
2018: A Boogie wit da Hoodie – "Come Closer" (featuring Queen Naija)
2018: G-Eazy – "1942" (featuring Yo Gotti and YBN Nahmir) 
2018: G-Eazy – "Drop" 
2018: Ty Dolla $ign – "Clout" (featuring 21 Savage) 
2018: Ty Dolla $ign – "South Beach" (featuring Quavo and French Montana) 
2018: Lyrica Anderson – "Rent" (featuring Blac Youngsta) 
2018: YBN Nahmir – "Cake" (featuring Wiz Khalifa)
2018: PnB Rock – "ABCD (Friend Zone)"  
2019: 2 Chainz – "Rule the World" (featuring Ariana Grande)
2019: K. Michelle – "Takes Two" (featuring Jeremih)
2019: Chris Brown – "Come Together" (featuring H.E.R.), "Emerald /Burgundy"
2019: Layton Greene – "Leave Em Alone" (featuring Lil Baby, City Girls and PnB Rock)
2019: Trouble – "She A Winner" (featuring City Girls) 
2019: PnB Rock – "I Like Girls" (featuring Lil Skies) 
2019: Teyana Taylor – "How You Want It?" (featuring King Combs)
2019: YFN Lucci – "All Night Long" (featuring Trey Songz) 
2019: Asher Angel - "One Thought Away" (feat. Wiz Khalifa)
2019: Fabolous – "Choosy" (featuring Jeremih and Davido)
2019:  DJ Pharris – "JUUG" (featuring Chief Keef and Jeremih)
2019: Tinashe – "Feelings"
2019: Tinashe – "Cash Race"
2019: Tinashe – "Link Up"
2019: King Combs – "Naughty" (featuring Jeremih)
2019: Fat Joe and Dre – "Hands On You" (featuring Jeremih and Bryson Tiller)
2019: Fat Joe and Dre – "Drive" (featuring Ty Dolla $ign and Jeremih)
2019: E-40 – "1 Question" (featuring Jeremih, Rick Ross and Chris Brown)
2019: Gucci Mane – "Hands Off" (featuring Jeremih)
2019: Tank – "Dirty (Remix)" (featuring Chris Brown, Feather and Rahky)
2019: Fabolous – "My Mind" (featuring Jacquees)
2019: Rubi Rose – "Hit Yo Dance" (featuring Yella Beezy and NLE Choppa)
2019: Tyla Yaweh - "I Think I Luv Her" (featuring YG)
2020: DreamDoll — "Who You Loving?" (featuring G-Eazy and Rahky) 
2020: Tamar Braxton — "Crazy Kind of Love"
2020: Trey Songz — "Back Home" (featuring Summer Walker)
2020: O.T. Genasis — "Back To You" (featuring Chris Brown and Charlie Wilson) 
2020: YFN Lucci — "Both of Us" (featuring Rick Ross and Layton Greene)
2020: Lil Durk & King Von "Still Trappin'"
2020: T.I. "Pardon"(featuring Lil Baby)
2020: T.I. "Hit Dogs Holla"(featuring Tokyo Jetz) 
2020: T.I. "Moon Juice"(featuring Snoop Dogg and Jeremih) 
2020: T.I. "1/2 Ticket"(featuring London Jae and Conway the Machine) 
2020: Lil Mosey "Jumping Out The Face"
2021: T.I. "Thank God"(featuring 21 Savage) 
2021: Symba "Gotta Love It"(featuring Ty Dolla $ign)
2021: G-Eazy "Provide"(featuring Chris Brown and Mark Morrison)
2021: LIL XXEL "What U Want"(featuring Tyga and Coi Leray)
2021: Yung Bleu "Baddest"(featuring Chris Brown and 2 Chainz) 
2021: Tink "Heat of the Moment", "Selfish"(with BLEU), "Chasin", "Rebel"(featuring Jeremih), "Regret", "Might Let You"(featuring Davido), "Dangerous", "FMB", "Signs (2021)", 
"Have You Ever", "Mixed Feelings" & "On My Own" 
2022: Tink "Goin Bad", "Switch", "Opposite", "Throwback", "Mine"(with Muni Long), "25 Reasons Interlude", 
"Cum See Me"(featuring Toosii), "Oooh Triflin"(featuring Fabolous), "Balance", "Drunk Text'n"
(with Layton Greene), "News"(with Russ), "Ghetto Luv"(featuring G Herbo) &
"Cum'n 2"
2022: Lakeyah "Mind Yo Business"(featuring Latto)
2023: Chloe Bailey "How Does It Feel"(featuring Chris Brown)

Co-written songs

List of Songs Co-written by Yung Berg

2007: Fabolous – "Diamonds"
2012: Driicky Graham – "Snap Backs & Tattoos"
2013: Cassie – "Turn Up"
2013: T-Pain – "Bad Bitches Link-Up"
2014: Jason Derulo – "Kama Sutra"
2016: K. Michelle – "Ain't You"
2016: Big Sean – "Bounce Back"
2017: Gucci Mane – "Tone It Down"
2017: Justine Skye – "Back For More"
2017: Kid Ink – "Swish"
2017: Chris Brown – "Questions"
2018: Ty Dolla Sign – "Pineapple"
2018: Tinashe – "Like I Used To"
2018: Tinashe – "Throw a fit"
2018: A Boogie wit da Hoodie — "Startender" 
2018: MihTy — "Imitate"

References

Hip hop discographies
Discographies of American artists
Rhythm and blues discographies